Iceland competed at the 2004 Summer Paralympics in Athens, Greece. The team included three athletes - two men and one woman. Icelandic competitors won four medals, one gold and three silver, to finish 47th in the medal table.

Medallists

Sports

Athletics

Men's track

Swimming

Table tennis

See also
Iceland at the Paralympics
Iceland at the 2004 Summer Olympics

References 

Nations at the 2004 Summer Paralympics
2004
Summer Paralympics